According to a public statement issued by the National Labor Federation in the late 1970s, 
"The National Labor Federation (NATLFED) is an organization of small worker associations encompassing over 20 organizing drives in various parts of the United States. Organizing drives exist in Oakland, Sacramento, Santa Cruz, Orange County, San Diego and Redding, California under the auspices of the Western Service Workers Association, on Long Island and in Binghamton and Wayne County, New York under the auspices of the Eastern Farm Workers Association, in New Brunswick, Princeton, Atlantic City, New Jersey; Rochester, Albany, Buffalo, New York; Baltimore, Maryland; Philadelphia under the auspices of the Eastern Service Workers Association, Medford and Eugene, Oregon under the Northwest Seasonal Workers Association, in Massachusetts, under the Western Massachusetts Labor Alliance and in many other areas. They are dedicated to the organization of the approximately 47 million unrecognized workers in the United States so far excluded from any of the somewhat dubious benefits of the National Labor Relations Act."

The organizations listed below have been reported as the associations (called entities) which comprise NATLFED. The individual organizations have usually been open about their participation in the network.

Almost all of the NATLFED entities were listed in the publication Invest Yourself between 1984 and the mid-1990s:  
"The descriptions of them--there are 38 in all--read very similarly: they are said to be "mutual benefits associations," providing the necessities of life to "the lowest paid strata" of unorganized workers, while applying a strategy of "systemic organizing" to produce "permanent change" in their conditions.  They all say as well that volunteers need no experience; they will be trained by professional organizers."

NATLFED entities conduct door-to-door canvassing and operate assistance programs for the poor;

Currently active NATLFED entities
 Alaska Workers Association  (Anchorage, Alaska)
 Bay Area Alternative Press  (Berkeley, California)
 Berkshire County Fuel Committee(Pittsfield, Massachusetts)
 California Committee of Friends and Relatives of Prisoners (California)
 California Homemakers Association  (Sacramento, California)
 Coalition of Concerned Legal Professionals  (Sacramento, California, New York City, New York, Philadelphia,  Pennsylvania)  (publishes Verdict and The Gavel)
 Coalition of Concerned Medical Professionals  (Central Valley/Redding, Oakland, Sacramento, Stockton, California; Bellport, Riverhead, Brooklyn, New York)
 Commemoration Committee for the Black Panther Party (Oakland, California) (Publishes The Commemorator) 
 Commission on Voluntary Service and Action(New York City, New York) (Publishes Invest Yourself: The  Catalog of Volunteer Opportunities) This entity is a 501(c)(3) nonprofit organization.
 Committee for South African Solidarity (San Francisco, Sacramento, California) (Publishes The South Africans Beacon)
 Eastern Farm Workers Association(Bellport, Lyons, Riverhead, Sodus, Syracuse, New York)
 Eastern Service Workers Association(Boston, Roxbury, Massachusetts; Atlantic City, New Brunswick, South Amboy, Pleasantville, Somerset, Trenton, New Jersey; Philadelphia, Pennsylvania; Rochester, New York)
 Friends of Seasonal and Service Workers (Portland, Oregon)
 Jackson County Fuel Committee  (Ashland, Oregon)
 Mid-Ohio Workers Association (Columbus, Ohio) 
 Midwest Workers Association (Chicago, Illinois)
 National Equal Justice Association (San Diego, San Francisco, California; New York City, Riverhead, New York) 
 Northwest Seasonal Workers Association (Medford, Oregon)
 Physicians Organizing Committee (San Francisco, California)
 Western Farm Workers Association(Stockton, Yuba City, California)
 Western Massachusetts Labor Action (Pittsfield, Massachusetts)
 Western Service Workers Association (Anaheim, Oakland, Central Valley/Redding, Los Angeles, Sacramento, San Diego, Santa Ana, Santa Cruz, Watsonville California)
 Women's Press Collective (South Brooklyn, New York) (Publishes Collective Endeavor) (distinct from the Women's Press Collective of Oakland, California)
 Workers Community Service Center (Sacramento, California)

Other names
The following names have been listed as NATLFED-run organizations in the past.
Some are alternate names for active organizations and offices, others are likely defunct.

 Alianza Campesina (Modesto, CA)
 Ashland Community Service Center (Ashland, OR)
 Association of Financial Aid Students(Dayton, Shaker Heights, OH)
 Boston Committee for Community Arts (Boston, MA)
 Carroll Street Properties  (New York; owner of NATLFED's Brooklyn Headquarters)
 Citizens for Migrant Workers (Northport, King's Park, NY)
 Citizens Relief Committee (Philadelphia, PA)
 Committee for Community Health and Safety (Trenton, NJ)
 Committee of Friends and Relatives of Prisoners  (Bellport, Riverhead, NY)
 Earth Shock Committee (Oakland, Watsonville, CA)
 Finger Lakes Equal Justice Association (Rochester, NY)
 National Foundation for Alternative Resources (NY)
 Gregorio Duarte Memorial Oakland Community Service and Health Center (Oakland, CA)
 Junior Eason Riverhead Community Service and Health Center (Riverhead, NY)
 Long Island Alternative Press(King's Park/Smithtown, NY)
 Long Island Equal Justice Association (Riverhead, NY)
 New Jersey Labor Defense Committee (Trenton, NJ)
 Philadelphia Committee on the Community Arts (Philadelphia, PA)
 Philadelphia Community Service Center (Philadelphia, PA)
 Shasta County Community Service Center (Central Valley/Redding, CA)
 Shasta County Food Committee (Central Valley/Redding, CA)
 South/Central Los Angeles Benefits Office (Los Angeles, CA)
 Suffolk Committee for Community Arts (Bellport, NY)
 Temporary Workers Organizing Committee (New Brunswick, NJ)
 Texas Farm Workers Union (Pharr, Hildago, TX)
 Vivian Cooper Community Service Center/Trenton Community Service Center (Trenton, NJ)
 Workers Benefit Council (Alameda County, CA; Rochester, NY)
 Writers and Scholars Institute (Princeton, NJ)

References

External links
 ESWAboston.org

NATLFED entities
National Labor Federation
Front organizations